McClain's Law is an American crime drama television series that aired on NBC during the 1981–1982 season. New episodes ended on March 20, and rebroadcasts continued until August 24, 1982.

Summary

The series starred former Gunsmoke lead James Arness in a rare non-western role as Jim McClain, a former police detective who was medically retired after being wounded in the leg in a gun battle in the line of duty.  He returns to duty thirteen years later to avenge the murder and robbery of a friend, and ends up coming out of retirement in order to share his expertise with a younger generation of police officers.

At first, his request to be returned to active duty is met with resistance by police department supervisors.  McClain is made to undergo physical fitness tests and a requalification and training program at the police academy.  He handily passes all tests and is returned to active duty on the department at his former rank of detective.  McClain is tough but compassionate.  He is regarded by his colleagues as being an "Old School" cop. He carries a Smith & Wesson .44 caliber revolver when most of his fellow officers carry .38 Special caliber sidearms.  His new coworkers come to respect McClain as a consummate professional of unyielding courage.  McClain's Law, like several other series from this period, was criticized for its level of violence. The co-stars were Marshall Colt and George DiCenzo. Shaaron Claridge also played a dispatcher. This was Arness' final TV series; hereafter he primarily appeared in a series of made-for-TV movies reprising Gunsmoke.

Cast
 James Arness as Detective Jim McClain
 George DiCenzo as Lieutenant Edward DeNisco
 Marshall Colt as Detective Harry Gates
 Conchata Ferrell as Vangie Cruise 
 Carl Franklin as Detective Jerry Cross

Notable guest stars
  Barbara Babcock
 Bibi Besch
 Scott Brady
  Julie Carmen
 Pat Corley
  Richard Jaeckel
  Arte Johnson
 Henry Jones
  Art Lund
  Richard Lynch

Episodes

DVD release
On June 21, 2016, Warner Archive Collection released McClain's Law - The Complete Series on DVD in Region 1 for the very first time.  This is a manufacture-on-demand (MOD) release, available exclusively through Warner's online store and Amazon.com.

References

External links
 

1981 American television series debuts
1982 American television series endings
1980s American crime drama television series
English-language television shows
NBC original programming
1980s American police procedural television series
Television series by MGM Television
Television shows set in California